The 1982–83 Fulham RLFC season was the third in the club's history. They competed in the 1982–83 Second Division of the Rugby Football League. They also competed in the 1982–83 Challenge Cup and the 1982–83 League Cup. They gained their first piece of silverware, finishing the season as champions and were promoted to the top tier of professional rugby league in the UK.

Second Division League Table

Players

References

External links
Rugby League Project
1982-83 Rugby Football League season at wigan.rlfans.com

London Broncos seasons
London Broncos season
1982 in rugby league by club
1982 in English rugby league
London Broncos season
1983 in rugby league by club
1983 in English rugby league